Canada-Nepal relations refers to foreign relations between Canada and the Federal Democratic Republic of Nepal.

History 

Relations were first established 18 January 1965, although earlier both nations were a part of the Colombo Plan. In 1970, the Canadian International Development Agency began distributing aid in Nepal. In 2003, a duty-free agreement was signed between the two nations. Nepal maintains an embassy on Queen Street in Ottawa, and has honorary consulates in Toronto, Montreal, Calgary, and Victoria, British Columbia. Canada's high commission in New Delhi is accredited to Nepal and maintains an honorary consulate in Kathmandu.

Canada has issued nearly $500 million in aid to Nepal throughout the course of relations, including $50 million for the April 2015 Nepal earthquake.

References

External links
 

 
Bilateral relations of Nepal
Nepal